Hilary Ruth Penfold  PSM (born 1953) is a former Australian parliamentary counsel and judge. She was the first woman to be First Parliamentary Counsel and the first woman to be a resident judge in the Supreme Court of the Australian Capital Territory.

Early life
Penfold was born in 1953 in Dunedin, New Zealand. At the age of three, her family moved to Australia. She was educated at Ascham School in Sydney. She studied the combined Arts / Law degrees course at the Australian National University in Canberra. She was a joint winner of the Tillyard Prize in 1976 with the theologian, philosopher and poet Kevin Hart.

Career
Penfold joined the Office of Parliamentary Counsel (Australia) in 1977. In 1993 she became the first woman to be appointed First Parliamentary Counsel. Her drafting included legislation for the Tampa affair (the Border Protection Bill, rejected by the Senate), workplace relations reforms (the Workplace Relations Act 1996), and the constitutional amendments which would have been required to have created an Australian republic in 1999. She was awarded the Public Service Medal in 2000. In 2001 she was the first woman to be appointed a Commonwealth Queen's Counsel.

In 2004 Penfold became Secretary of the newly created Department of Parliamentary Services.

In 2008 she became the first woman to be a resident judge of the Supreme Court of the Australian Capital Territory. Margaret Beazley had been an additional judge from 1994 to 1997, but Penfold was the first woman to be a resident judge. She retired in 2018.

Personal life
Penfold is married to Mark Cunliffe, and has three children.

References

1953 births
Living people
Australian public servants
Judges of the Supreme Court of the Australian Capital Territory
First Parliamentary Counsel
Australian National University alumni
People educated at Ascham School